The Art Collection of the Fondazione Cassa di Risparmio di Perugia is a private collection of artworks, mainly from the region of Perugia, acquired by former financial institution Cassa di Risparmio di Perugia. The collection is divided among two locations in the city of Perugia: the Palazzo Graziani and the Palazzo Baldeschi. The Palazzo Graziani (1554–1569) was designed by Jacopo Barozzi da Vignola. The building is also notable for its sumptuous main salon, the Sala della Presidenza, which was decorated at the end of the 19th century with large canvases and frescoes painted by Annibale Brugnoli, recalling both events of the Risorgimento and the history of Perugia. The Palazzo Baldeschi al Corso (16th century, named after the noble family descended from Baldus de Ubaldis) was obtained by the foundation on November 28, 2002.

Collection

References

External links
Official website
Digitized catalog of the collection

Art museums and galleries in Umbria
Fondazione Cassa di Risparmio di Lucca
Museums in Perugia